Mohamed Ismail (born 28 October 1958) is an Egyptian basketball player. He competed in the men's tournament at the 1988 Summer Olympics.

References

1958 births
Living people
Egyptian men's basketball players
Olympic basketball players of Egypt
Basketball players at the 1988 Summer Olympics
Place of birth missing (living people)